Unman, Wittering and Zigo is a 1971 British thriller film directed by John Mackenzie and starring David Hemmings, Douglas Wilmer and Carolyn Seymour. It is adapted by Simon Raven from Giles Cooper's 1958 radio drama Unman, Wittering and Zigo.

The movie's title was parodied in Little Britain, and by Rowan Atkinson in a very well-received sketch for one of the early Secret Policeman's Ball concerts for Amnesty International.

Plot
A new teacher arrives at a school and begins to suspect his predecessor was murdered by the pupils, though his suspicions are written off as paranoia. He sets out to prevent the same fate from befalling him.

Cast
David Hemmings as John Ebony
Douglas Wilmer as Headmaster
Carolyn Seymour as Silvia Ebony
Hamilton Dyce as Mr. Winstanley
Anthony Haygarth as Cary Farthingale
Barbara Lott as Mrs. Winstanley
Donald Gee as Stretton
David Jackson as Clackworth
Hubert Rees as Blisterine
David Auker as Aggeridge
Tom Morris as Ankerton
Richard Gill as Borby
Michael Kitchen as Bungabine
Nicholas Hoye as Cloistermouth
Tom Owen as Cuthbun
Toby Simpson as Hogg
James Wardroper as Lipstrob
Clive Gray as Muffett
Rodney Paulden as Munn Major
Keith Janess as Orris
Christopher Moran as Root
Michael Cashman as Terhew
Paul Aston as Trimble
Michael Howe as Unman
Colin Barrie as Wittering

The closing credits also list Zigo (who never appears in the film) as "absent".

Production
The radio play was adapted for BBC TV in 1965.

Film rights were bought by Mediarts, a new company established in London and Hollywood. It was to be the first of four pictures from the company, the others being the directorial debut of Frederic Raphael, a screenplay by Dory Previn and a script by Odie Hawkins. Paramount agreed to distribute.

David Hemmings made the film without telling Hemdale, the company who had exclusive call on his services. This led to a lawsuit.

Filming
Filming began in August 1970.

The film was set in Cornwall. Some outdoor scenes were filmed at St David's College Llandudno, Wales, and nearby St. Tudno's churchyard, Great Orme, but others and interior scenes were mostly filmed in the buildings of Reading Blue Coat School, Sonning, Berkshire, using some of its pupils as extras during the summer holidays.

Critical reception
The BFI's Screenonline called it "a finely wrought psychological suspense drama."

Leonard Maltin's Movie Guide rates the film three stars, calling it, "[A] nifty little sleeper...creepy, chilling mystery, loaded with twists..."

References

External links

Review of film at New York Times

1971 films
1970s thriller films
British thriller films
Paramount Pictures films
Films directed by John Mackenzie (film director)
Films about educators
Films set in schools
Films based on radio series
Films with screenplays by Simon Raven
1970s English-language films
1970s British films